Linus Sandin (born 19 May 1996) is a Swedish professional ice hockey player for Rögle BK of the Swedish Hockey League (SHL).

Playing career
Undrafted, Sandin signed a one-year, entry-level contract as a free agent with the Philadelphia Flyers on 29 April 2020. On 7 August, Sandin was returned on loan to former Swedish club HV71 to begin the 2020–21 season, until the commencement of the delayed North American season. On 14 June 2021, Sandin signed a one-year contract extension with the Flyers.

Unable to make the Flyers opening night roster for the  season, Sandin sought and was mutually released from the remaining year of his contract with the Flyers on 14 October 2022. In returning to his native Sweden, he was immediately announced to have signed a three-year contract with original club, Rögle BK of the SHL.

Personal life
Sandin has a younger brother Rasmus Sandin who is a player for the Washington Capitals of the National Hockey League (NHL).

Career statistics

References

External links

1996 births
Almtuna IS players
HV71 players
Lehigh Valley Phantoms players
Living people
Mora IK players
Philadelphia Flyers players
Rögle BK players
Sportspeople from Uppsala
Swedish ice hockey right wingers
Undrafted National Hockey League players